This is a timeline of online file storage and collaboration service Dropbox.

Full timeline

References 

Dropbox